Revep is the third collaboration record between Japanese composer Ryuichi Sakamoto and German electronic artist Carsten Nicolai (here credited as Alva Noto). This EP continues the series titled the Virus Series. The EP was released on 23 May 2006 via Raster-Noton label.

Overview
The compositions revolve around a collaborative new arrangement of Sakamoto's classic "Merry Christmas Mr. Lawrence", the theme music to the 1983 movie Merry Christmas Mr. Lawrence starring David Bowie, Takeshi Kitano, and Ryuichi Sakamoto himself.

Reception

—Nick Lawrence, Higher Frequency

Track listing

Notes: "Ax Mr.L." refers to a track that was composed by Mr. Sakamoto in 1983 for the movie Merry Christmas Mr. Lawrence.

Personnel
Ryuichi Sakamoto – piano, songwriter
Carsten Nicolai – producer, additional sounds
Alva Noto – songwriter

See also
Merry Christmas Mr. Lawrence (instrumental)
Ryuichi Sakamoto discography

References

2006 albums
Alva Noto albums
Ryuichi Sakamoto albums
Collaborative albums
Raster-Noton albums